The 1967 NCAA University Division baseball season, play of college baseball in the United States organized by the National Collegiate Athletic Association (NCAA) began in the spring of 1967.  The season progressed through the regular season and concluded with the 1967 College World Series.  The College World Series, held for the twenty first time in 1967, consisted of one team from each of eight geographical districts and was held in Omaha, Nebraska at Johnny Rosenblatt Stadium as a double-elimination tournament.  Arizona State claimed the championship.

Conference winners
This is a partial list of conference champions from the 1967 season.  Each of the eight geographical districts chose, by various methods, the team that would represent them in the NCAA Tournament.  11 teams earned automatic bids by winning their conference championship while 14 teams earned at-large selections.

Conference standings
The following is an incomplete list of conference standings:

College World Series

The 1967 season marked the twenty first NCAA Baseball Tournament, which culminated with the eight team College World Series.  The College World Series was held in Omaha, Nebraska.  The eight teams played a double-elimination format, with Arizona State claiming their second championship with an 11–2 win over Houston in the final.

Award winners

All-America team

References